The 1937 Wightman Cup was the 15th edition of the annual women's team tennis competition between the United States and Great Britain. It was held at the West Side Tennis Club in Forest Hills, Queens in New York City in the United States.

References

Wightman Cups by year
Wightman Cup, 1937
Wightman Cup
Wightman Cup
Wightman Cup
Wightman Cup